Flip or Flop is a television franchise of television programs. With the exception of Flip or Flop: Follow Up, each series follows a format, with couples in different parts of the United States purchasing homes, flipping them, and reselling.

, 132 episodes of the Flip or Flop franchise have aired.

Franchise overview

Hosts

Overview

Flip or Flop

The El Moussas were both real estate agents prior to the crash in 2008, and later they began flipping homes, mostly in Orange County, California.

In 2011, Tarek asked a friend to help him make an audition tape for HGTV. The friend filmed an entire episode of the process of house flipping from start to finish. The audition tape was sent to HGTV, and they were interested in talking to the couple. In 2012, HGTV signed the couple to a regular weekly program that shows the process of buying distressed property and renovating it.

Christina's expertise is primarily in design, while Tarek finds and renovates homes. The show follows them as they buy homes, typically bank-owned, short sales or foreclosures, to renovate and resell.

Flip or Flop Follow-Up

Flip or Flop Follow-Up premiered July 14, 2015. The show revisits old house flips from previous Flip or Flop episodes. The series goes deeper into the issues with the individual flips, and shows previously unaired footage. The series also updates on houses that remained unsold at the time of the original production. These three stories include a successful flip, a flop, and a follow-up that ends with Tarek and Christina revisiting one of their house flips. This series did not return for a season 2 making it the first series in the franchise to end.

Flip or Flop Vegas

Flip or Flop Vegas is a television series airing on HGTV hosted by real estate agents Bristol and Aubrey Marunde. Filmed in Las Vegas, Nevada, it premiered on April 6, 2017. On June 5, 2017, HGTV announced Flip or Flop Vegas would be renewed for a second season, with 16 episodes.

Flip or Flop Atlanta

Flip or Flop Atlanta is a television series airing on HGTV hosted by real estate agent Anita Corsini and contractor husband Ken. Filmed in the metro Atlanta, Georgia area, it premiered on July 20, 2017. On August 21, 2017, HGTV announced Flip or Flop Atlanta would be renewed for a second season, with 14 episodes, which is expected to debut in 2018.

Flip or Flop Nashville

Flip or Flop Nashville will be a television series airing on HGTV hosted by real estate agents DeRon Jenkins and Page Turner. It will premiere on January 18, 2018 and will be filmed in Nashville, Tennessee.

Flip or Flop Fort Worth

Flip or Flop Fort Worth is a television series airing on HGTV hosted by real estate agents Andy and Ashley Williams.  Filmed in Dallas, Texas, it premiered on November 2, 2017.

Flip or Flop Chicago
On March 1, 2017, HGTV announced that "Flip or Flop" would expand to Chicago, Illinois. The show featured a new couple, Mark and Liz Perez, flipping houses in Chicago, Illinois. It premiered as a pilot on March 23, 2017.

Christina on the Coast

In June 2018 it was announced that Christina would be receiving her own spin off show known as Christina on the Coast. The series premiere will focus on Christina renovating her new home following her divorce; with the remaining seven episodes focusing on her fixing up other people's homes. Filming began in fall 2018, for a spring 2019 premiere. On February 13, 2019, it was announced that the series will premiere on May 23, 2019.

See also
Love It or List It (franchise)
Property Brothers (franchise)

References

 
Television franchises